Glenn James Scott (born 19 September 1991) is an Australian motorcycle racer.

Career
In 2007 he won the Australian 125 GP Championship; in the same year he competed in the 125cc Australian Grand Prix as a replacement for the ill Stefano Bianco. After finishing 17th in the 2009 Spanish 125cc Championship he competed in Australian Supersport and Superbike championships. In 2015 he was signed to race in the Supersport World Championship for AARK Racing aboard a Honda CBR600RR. For 2016 he moved to the Lorini team; a leg injury sustained in the third round of the season prevented him from starting any race in the championship for the rest of the year. In 2017 he raced a Kawasaki ZX-10R for Agro On–Benjan–Kawasaki in the European Superstock 1000 Championship.

Career statistics

Grand Prix motorcycle racing

By season

Races by year
(key) (Races in bold indicate pole position; races in italics indicate fastest lap)

Supersport World Championship

Races by year
(key) (Races in bold indicate pole position; races in italics indicate fastest lap)

References

External links
 

Living people
1991 births
Australian motorcycle racers
125cc World Championship riders
Supersport World Championship riders